Benita Martínez Pastoriza de Sarmiento (26 August 1819, San Juan, Argentina – 6 October 1890 in Buenos Aires, Argentina) was the second wife of Domingo Faustino Sarmiento, Argentina's First Lady, and the mother of Domingo Fidel Sarmiento. She was married to Domingo Castro y Calvo before being married to President Sarmiento.

References

First ladies and gentlemen of Argentina

1819 births
1890 deaths
19th-century Argentine people